Lee Chang-sub (born ), better known mononymously as Changsub, is a South Korean singer, songwriter, host and musical actor. He is the lead vocalist of the South Korean boy group BtoB.

Biography
Lee Changsub was born in Suwon, Gyeonggi-do, South Korea. He studied Practical Music at Howon University with BTOB group-mate Im Hyunsik. They both got admitted in 2011 with a cutthroat 3000:5 ratio at that time.

Prior to his debut as an idol, he won a Daesang at the 16th Suwon Music Festival 2008, and even became vice president of Red Cross Youth Gyeonggi Province in 2009.

Military service
He began his military duty by enlisting as an active duty soldier on January 14, 2019. On July 24, Lee recorded a special single— a new theme song for the ROK Army alongside Shinee's Onew and Key, Exo's Xiumin, Infinite's Kim Sung-kyu, 2AM's Jo Kwon and Jinwoon, Yoon Ji-sung and actors Kim Minseok, and Lee Jae-kyoon.

He was officially discharged on August 21, 2020 following the COVID-19 protocol.

Philanthropy
On October 21, 2017, Lee Chang-sub visited his alma mater and delivered a scholarship of ₩10 million to his high school alma-mater, Samil Commercial High School. Changsub said,  "I couldn't have imagined this when I was in school. It's an honor to be in a situation where I’m able to deliver this scholarship for the younger generation of students. I’ve been able to come this far thanks to my teachers and my school who helped me until the end when I was a student."

Career

Lee debuted as the lead vocalist of BTOB on March 21, 2012.

Lee has also participated in lyrics composition of some tracks by BTOB including, "Last Day", "Killing Me" and "Melody".

He became a contestant on King of Masked Singer introducing himself as "Mr. Wifi" in 2015. In 2016, he joined the cast of new season of SBS's reality-documentary show, Law of the Jungle, which was filmed in Mongolia.

He started his career in musicals in 2017. He was cast in the musical adaptation of "Boys Over Flowers" as the lead, Goo Jun-pyo. He also played a role in the Korean production of the musical "Napoleon" as Lucien, Napoleon's little brother. Next, he was cast as the titular main character in the musical "Edgar Allan Poe".

The following year, he landed another leading role as Eddie Birdlace in "Dogfight". His final musical project before military enlistment was "Iron Mask" where he undertook the dual leading role of King Louis XIV as well as his twin brother Philippe 

On October 27, 2020, Cube announced that the currently active members of BtoB have formed a unit called BtoB 4U consisting Eunkwang, Minhyuk, Changsub and Peniel. The unit debuted on November 16 with their first mini-album, Inside and title track "Show Your Love".

Solo
Lee Changsub was the first member to debut his own solo album, "bpm 82.5", in Japan. With the title track "At The End", this Japan debut in 2017 also marked the launch of the 'Piece of BTOB' project, in which each month one BTOB member would  showcase a solo release.

In December 2018, he released his first Korean solo album titled "Mark". He considered it his gift to his fans before enlistment.

He held his first solo concert, SPACE in January 4, 5 and 6, 2019 at the Yes24 Live Hall in Gwangjin District, Seoul. 

In September 6 2022, he released his solo album titled [reissue #001 'SURRENDER'].

Discography

Extended plays

Singles

As lead artist

Collaborations

Soundtrack appearances

Filmography

Television series

Variety shows

Hosting

Web shows

Theatre

Musical theatre

Concert
 2019 Lee Changsub Solo Concert – SPACE (January 4–6, 2019)

References

External links
 

Official website (korean)

Cube Entertainment artists
People from Suwon
1991 births
Living people
K-pop singers
South Korean male idols
South Korean male dancers
BtoB (band) members
21st-century South Korean  male singers